Bruce Greaves McIntosh (born March 17, 1949) is an American retired ice hockey defenseman who played in two National Hockey League games with the Minnesota North Stars during the 1972–73 season. McIntosh was signed as a free agent by the North Stars after playing for the University of Minnesota men's hockey team. He now co-owns a Golf Course in northern Minnesota.

Career statistics

Regular season and playoffs

Awards and honors

References

External links
 

1949 births
Living people
American men's ice hockey defensemen
Cleveland Barons (1937–1973) players
Ice hockey players from Minnesota
Jacksonville Barons players
Minnesota Golden Gophers men's ice hockey players
Minnesota North Stars players
Saginaw Gears players
Sportspeople from Edina, Minnesota
Undrafted National Hockey League players